Little Jazz is an album by American jazz trumpeter Roy Eldridge recorded in 1954 and originally released on the Clef label. "Little Jazz" was Roy Eldridge's nickname.

Reception

Allmusic awarded the album 4½ stars.

Track listing
 "A Foggy Day" (George Gershwin, Ira Gershwin) - 5:44
 "Blue Moon" (Richard Rodgers, Lorenz Hart) - 4:00 	
 "Stormy Weather" (Harold Arlen, Ted Koehler) - 4:27
 "Sweethearts on Parade" (Carmen Lombardo, Charles Newman) - 4:33
 "If I Had You" (Jimmy Campbell, Reg Connelly, Ted Shapiro) - 3:48
 "I Only Have Eyes for You" (Harry Warren, Al Dubin) - 7:15 	
 "Sweet Georgia Brown" (Ben Bernie, Maceo Pinkard, Kenneth Casey) - 4:32 	
 "The Song Is Ended" (Irving Berlin) - 3:35

Personnel 
Roy Eldridge - trumpet
Oscar Peterson - piano
Herb Ellis - guitar
Ray Brown - bass
Buddy Rich - drums

References 

1954 albums
Roy Eldridge albums
Clef Records albums
Verve Records albums
Albums produced by Norman Granz